San Salvador Fútbol Club was a professional football club located in San Salvador, El Salvador that participated in Primera División de Fútbol Profesional from 2002 to 2008.

The club played its home games at Estadio Cuscatlán, which is the largest stadium in El Salvador.

History
The club was only founded on 7 January 2002 and bought the licence of ADET to compete in the 2002 Clausura season of the Salvadoran Premier Division. They boasted an impressive squad of Salvadoran internationals, most prominently Salvadoran legend Mágico González, and won the 2003 Clausura league title.

After the Clausura 2008 season, San Salvador finished second last in the league and as a result had to take part in a playoff with Segunda División runner-up Juventud Independiente to stay in the First division. San Salvador lost the home and away playoff 4–2 on aggregate and was relegated. Following this San Salvador continued to have problems, although this time it was due to players complaining that they had not been paid. San Salvador could not afford to pay its players, so it decided to sell its spot in the Segunda División, and paid its players with the money that they got. This effectively killed the club, and it has since ceased operations.

Home stadium
 Estadio Cuscatlán (2002–2008)

Honours
Clausura 2003: 1
2003

Year-by-year

Head coaches
 Jaime Rodríguez (Jan 2002 -)
 Rubén Alonso  (Aug 2002 – Dec 2003)
 Daniel Uberti (Dec 2003 – Feb 2004)
 Miloš Miljanić (Feb 2004 – April 2004)
 Saul Lorenzo Rivero (June 2004 – Dec 2004)
 Hugo Coria (Jan 2005– June 2005)
 Juan Ramón Paredes (July 2005 – October 2005)
 Juan Quarterone (October 2005 – Feb 2006)
 Antonio Orellana Rico (Feb 2006–Sep 2006)
 Hugo Coria (Sep 2006 – Dec 2006)
 Antonio Orellana Rico (Feb 2007 – April 2007)
 Saul Lorenzo Rivero (April 2007– August 2007)
 Oscar Emigdio Benítez (Apertura 2007 – Jan 2008)
 Rubén Alonso  (March 2008– July 2008)

Team records
Games: TBD (100)
Goals: Alexander Obregon (37)
Assists: TBD (36)
Clean Sheets: TBD

Top goalscorers 

Note: ''Players in bold text are still active with San Salvador

External links
 http://www.elgrafico.com/index.php?eqp=10

Association football clubs established in 2002
San Salvador
Defunct football clubs in El Salvador
Association football clubs disestablished in 2008
2002 establishments in El Salvador
2008 disestablishments in El Salvador